Mamoru "Moe" Oye (born 1 April 1937) is a Canadian judoka, one of only five Canadian judoka to achieve the rank of kudan (ninth dan), and has been deeply involved in the development of Canadian Judo, especially in Manitoba. He has served as President of Judo Manitoba and Vice-President of Judo Canada, coached Olympic competitors Mark Berger, Ewan Beaton, and Niki Jenkins, and was inducted into the Judo Canada Hall of Fame in 1996 and the Manitoba Sports Hall of Fame in 2000. He was promoted to kudan in January 2021.

Interviews

Further reading

See also
 Judo in Manitoba
 Judo in Canada
 List of Canadian judoka

References

Canadian male judoka
1937 births
Living people